Hot chips refer to French fries in British and Commonwealth English.

Hot chips may also refer to:
Hot and spicy potato chips or crisps, in North American English
Hot Chip, an English synthpop band
Hot Chips, an annual technological symposium